Vivi-Tone was a musical instrument company formed in partnership by former instrument designer for Gibson Guitar Corporation, Lloyd Loar, Lewis A. Williams, and Walter Moon. The company was incorporated in Kalamazoo, Michigan on November 1, 1933, with executive offices in Detroit. Though the company brought forth many innovative ideas in instrument design, it was ultimately commercially unsuccessful.

Instruments

Vivi-Tone produced guitars, violins, mandolins, an electric keyboard, and at least one amplifier (the so-called "Aggrandizer").  One acoustic guitar design featured a secondary soundboard (the back of the guitar) as well as a primary soundboard (the top of the guitar). This secondary soundboard had f-holes, and was recessed from the rim of the guitar to keep this soundboard away from the player’s body. Another acoustic-electric guitar design from the mid-1930s had essentially a plank body, making it one of the very early examples of a solid body guitar.

References

See also
Lloyd Loar
Electric guitar
Electric piano

Musical instrument manufacturing companies of the United States
Manufacturing companies based in Kalamazoo, Michigan